
Restaurant De Boterbloem is a defunct restaurant in Heerlen, Netherlands. It was a fine dining restaurant that was awarded one Michelin star in 2001 and retained that rating until 2004. Winthaegen closed the restaurant in 2004 and started his new restaurant Het Vervolg on the same location but with another formula. He sold the restaurant shortly after the change.

Owner and head chef of the restaurant was Léon Winthaegen.

De Boterbloem earned a Bib Gourmand in the year 2000.

See also
List of Michelin starred restaurants in the Netherlands

References 

Restaurants in the Netherlands
Michelin Guide starred restaurants in the Netherlands
Defunct restaurants in the Netherlands
De Boterbloem
De Boterbloem